Sherif R. Zaki (November 24, 1955 – November 21, 2021) was an American pathologist. He was the chief of the Centers for Disease Control infectious diseases pathology branch.  Sometimes called a "disease detective", his career included research on Ebola outbreaks, Zika virus outbreaks, the 2001 anthrax attacks, and leptospirosis.

Personal life 
Zaki was born in Alexandria, Egypt. He died on November 21, 2021.

References

1955 births
2021 deaths
American pathologists
Centers for Disease Control and Prevention people
Egyptian emigrants to the United States
People from Alexandria